KUWS is a public radio station in Superior, Wisconsin, licensed to the Board of Regents of the University of Wisconsin System and operated by the University of Wisconsin–Superior since January 21, 1966. KUWS is an affiliate of Wisconsin Public Radio's Ideas Network. It also airs university and student-produced programming weeknights with 91 Jazz St. from 7:00 to 10:00 and College Rock from 10:00 to 1:00 am.*  KUWS broadcasts on 91.3 FM with 83,000 watts. KUWS was previously heard on translator station W275AF in the Ashland-Washburn-Bayfield area at 102.5 FM before September 12, 2011, when full-power WUWS (90.9) was launched from Ashland, replacing W275AF.  WUWS continues to relay KUWS's schedule and is programmed from WPR's Superior studios.

The original station call letters were WSSU, representing Wisconsin Superior State University. The call letters KUWS were assigned on August 1, 1988, as part of the station's affiliation with Wisconsin Public Radio. KUWS was permitted a "K" prefix, despite its location east of the Mississippi, due to Duluth-Superior's status as a "mixed" market, with several K-prefix stations already licensed to Superior.

The KUWS studios are in the Holden Fine Arts Center at 1805 Catlin Avenue in Superior. The studios also provide local programming for Wisconsin Public Radio's NPR News and Classical Music network station for northwest Wisconsin, WHSA in Brule, as well as WHWA in Washburn, WSSU in Superior, and WUWS in Ashland.  The KUWS transmitting facility is co-located with KBJR-TV in the Duluth tower farm.

Satellite station
In addition to the main station, KUWS is relayed by an additional full-power station in the Chequamegon Bay and Apostle Islands region east of Superior to widen its broadcast area.

See also
Wisconsin Public Radio
University of Wisconsin–Superior

References

External links

Radio stations in Superior, Wisconsin
University of Wisconsin–Superior
Wisconsin Public Radio
NPR member stations